The decimal numeral system (also called the base-ten positional numeral system and denary  or decanary) is the standard system for denoting integer and non-integer numbers. It is the extension to non-integer numbers of the Hindu–Arabic numeral system. The way of denoting numbers in the decimal system is often referred to as decimal notation.

A decimal numeral (also often just decimal or, less correctly, decimal number), refers generally to the notation of a number in the decimal numeral system. Zero-digits after a decimal separator serve the purpose of signifying the precision of a value.

The numbers that may be represented in the decimal system are the decimal fractions.

The decimal system has been extended to infinite decimals for representing any real number, by using an infinite sequence of digits after the decimal separator (see decimal representation). In this context, the decimal numerals with a finite number of non-zero digits after the decimal separator are sometimes called terminating decimals. A repeating decimal is an infinite decimal that, after some place, repeats indefinitely the same sequence of digits (e.g.). An infinite decimal represents a rational number, the quotient of two integers, if and only if it is a repeating decimal or has a finite number of non-zero digits.

Origin

Many numeral systems of ancient civilizations use ten and its powers for representing numbers, possibly because there are ten fingers on two hands and people started counting by using their fingers. Examples are firstly the Egyptian numerals, then the Brahmi numerals, Greek numerals, Hebrew numerals, Roman numerals, and Chinese numerals. Very large numbers were difficult to represent in these old numeral systems, and only the best mathematicians were able to multiply or divide large numbers. These difficulties were completely solved with the introduction of the Hindu–Arabic numeral system for representing integers. This system has been extended to represent some non-integer numbers, called decimal fractions or decimal numbers, for forming the decimal numeral system.

Decimal notation 

For writing numbers, the decimal system uses ten decimal digits, a decimal mark, and, for negative numbers, a minus sign "−". The decimal digits are 0, 1, 2, 3, 4, 5, 6, 7, 8, 9; the decimal separator is the dot "" in many countries (mostly English-speaking), and a comma "" in other countries.

For representing a non-negative number, a decimal numeral consists of
 either a (finite) sequence of digits (such as "2017"), where the entire sequence represents an integer,

or a decimal mark separating two sequences of digits (such as "20.70828")
.
If , that is, if the first sequence contains at least two digits, it is generally assumed that the first digit  is not zero. In some circumstances it may be useful to have one or more 0's on the left; this does not change the value represented by the decimal: for example, .

For representing a negative number, a minus sign is placed before .

The numeral  represents the number
.
The integer part or integral part of a decimal numeral is the integer written to the left of the decimal separator (see also truncation). For a non-negative decimal numeral, it is the largest integer that is not greater than the decimal. The part from the decimal separator to the right is the fractional part, which equals the difference between the numeral and its integer part.

When the integral part of a numeral is zero, it may occur, typically in computing, that the integer part is not written (for example, instead of ). In normal writing, this is generally avoided, because of the risk of confusion between the decimal mark and other punctuation.

In brief, the contribution of each digit to the value of a number depends on its position in the numeral. That is, the decimal system is a positional numeral system.

Decimal fractions 

Decimal fractions (sometimes called decimal numbers, especially in contexts involving explicit fractions) are the  rational numbers that may be expressed as a fraction whose denominator is a power of ten.

More generally, a decimal with  digits after the separator (a point or comma) represents the fraction with denominator , whose numerator is the integer obtained by removing the separator.

It follows that a number is a decimal fraction if and only if it has a finite decimal representation.

Expressed as fully reduced fractions, the decimal numbers are those whose denominator is a product of a power of 2 and a power of 5. Thus the smallest denominators of decimal numbers are

Real number approximation

Decimal numerals do not allow an exact representation for all real numbers, e.g. for the real number . Nevertheless, they allow approximating every real number with any desired accuracy, e.g., the decimal 3.14159 approximates the real , being less than 10−5 off; so decimals are widely used in science, engineering and everyday life.

Numbers are very often obtained as the result of measurement. In practice, measurement results are often given with a certain number of digits after the decimal point, which indicate the error bounds. For example, although 0.080 and 0.08 denote the same number, the decimal numeral 0.080 suggests a measurement with an error less than 0.001, while the numeral 0.08 indicates an absolute error bounded by 0.01. In both cases, the true value of the measured quantity could be, for example, 0.0803 or 0.0796 (see also significant figures).

Infinite decimal expansion

For a real number  and an integer , let  denote the (finite) decimal expansion of the greatest number that is not greater than  that has exactly  digits after the decimal mark. This way one has
,

,

which is either 0, if , or gets arbitrarily small as  tends to infinity. According to the definition of a limit,  is the limit of  when  tends to infinity. This is written asor
 ,

Conversely, for any integer  and any sequence of digits the (infinite) expression  is an infinite decimal expansion of a real number . This expansion is unique if neither all  are equal to 9 nor all  are equal to 0 for  large enough (for all  greater than some natural number ).

In summary, every real number that is not a decimal fraction has a unique infinite decimal expansion.

Rational numbers 

Long division allows computing the infinite decimal expansion of a rational number. If the rational number is a decimal fraction, the division stops eventually, producing a decimal numeral, which may be prolongated into an infinite expansion by adding infinitely many zeros. If the rational number is not a decimal fraction, the division may continue indefinitely. However, as all successive remainders are less than the divisor, there are only a finite number of possible remainders, and after some place, the same sequence of digits must be repeated indefinitely in the quotient. That is, one has a repeating decimal. For example,
 = 0.012345679012... (with the group 012345679 indefinitely repeating).

The converse is also true: if, at some point in the decimal representation of a number, the same string of digits starts repeating indefinitely, the number is rational.

or, dividing both numerator and denominator by 6, .

Decimal computation 

Most modern computer hardware and software systems commonly use a binary representation internally (although many early computers, such as the ENIAC or the IBM 650, used decimal representation internally).
For external use by computer specialists, this binary representation is sometimes presented in the related octal or hexadecimal systems.

For most purposes, however, binary values are converted to or from the equivalent decimal values for presentation to or input from humans; computer programs express literals in decimal by default. (123.1, for example, is written as such in a computer program, even though many computer languages are unable to encode that number precisely.)

Both computer hardware and software also use internal representations which are effectively decimal for storing decimal values and doing arithmetic. Often this arithmetic is done on data which are encoded using some variant of binary-coded decimal, especially in database implementations, but there are other decimal representations in use (including decimal floating point such as in newer revisions of the IEEE 754 Standard for Floating-Point Arithmetic).

Decimal arithmetic is used in computers so that decimal fractional results of adding (or subtracting) values with a fixed length of their fractional part always are computed to this same length of precision. This is especially important for financial calculations, e.g., requiring in their results integer multiples of the smallest currency unit for book keeping purposes. This is not possible in binary, because the negative powers of  have no finite binary fractional representation; and is generally impossible for multiplication (or division). See Arbitrary-precision arithmetic for exact calculations.

History 

Many ancient cultures calculated with numerals based on ten, sometimes argued due to human hands typically having ten fingers/digits. Standardized weights used in the Indus Valley civilization were based on the ratios: 1/20, 1/10, 1/5, 1/2, 1, 2, 5, 10, 20, 50, 100, 200, and 500, while their standardized ruler – the Mohenjo-daro ruler – was divided into ten equal parts. Egyptian hieroglyphs, in evidence since around 3000 BCE, used a purely decimal system, as did the Cretan hieroglyphs of the Minoans whose numerals are closely based on the Egyptian model. The decimal system was handed down to the consecutive Bronze Age cultures of Greece, including Linear A (c. 18th century BCE−1450 BCE) and Linear B (c. 1375−1200 BCE) – the number system of classical Greece also used powers of ten, including, Roman numerals, an intermediate base of 5. Notably, the polymath Archimedes (c. 287–212 BCE) invented a decimal positional system in his Sand Reckoner which was based on 108 and later led the German mathematician Carl Friedrich Gauss to lament what heights science would have already reached in his days if Archimedes had fully realized the potential of his ingenious discovery. Hittite hieroglyphs (since 15th century BCE) were also strictly decimal.

Some non-mathematical ancient texts such as the Vedas, dating back to 1700–900 BCE make use of decimals and mathematical decimal fractions.

The Egyptian hieratic numerals, the Greek alphabet numerals, the Hebrew alphabet numerals, the Roman numerals, the Chinese numerals and early Indian Brahmi numerals are all non-positional decimal systems, and required large numbers of symbols. For instance, Egyptian numerals used different symbols for 10, 20 to 90, 100, 200 to 900, 1000, 2000, 3000, 4000, to 10,000.
The world's earliest positional decimal system was the Chinese rod calculus.

History of decimal fractions 

Decimal fractions were first developed and used by the Chinese in the end of 4th century BCE, and then spread to the Middle East and from there to Europe. The written Chinese decimal fractions were non-positional. However, counting rod fractions were positional.

Qin Jiushao in his book Mathematical Treatise in Nine Sections (1247) denoted 0.96644 by

     , meaning

096644

J. Lennart Berggren notes that positional decimal fractions appear for the first time in a book by the Arab mathematician Abu'l-Hasan al-Uqlidisi written in the 10th century. The Jewish mathematician Immanuel Bonfils used decimal fractions around 1350, anticipating Simon Stevin, but did not develop any notation to represent them. The Persian mathematician Jamshīd al-Kāshī claimed to have discovered decimal fractions himself in the 15th century. Al Khwarizmi introduced fraction to Islamic countries in the early 9th century; a Chinese author has alleged that his fraction presentation was an exact copy of traditional Chinese mathematical fraction from Sunzi Suanjing. This form of fraction with numerator on top and denominator at bottom without a horizontal bar was also used by al-Uqlidisi and by al-Kāshī in his work "Arithmetic Key".

A forerunner of modern European decimal notation was introduced by Simon Stevin in the 16th century.

John Napier introduced using the period (.) to separate the integer part of a decimal number from the fractional part in his book on constructing tables of logarithms, published posthumously in 1620.

Natural languages 
A method of expressing every possible natural number using a set of ten symbols emerged in India. Several Indian languages show a straightforward decimal system. Many Indo-Aryan and Dravidian languages have numbers between 10 and 20 expressed in a regular pattern of addition to 10.

The Hungarian language also uses a straightforward decimal system. All numbers between 10 and 20 are formed regularly (e.g. 11 is expressed as "tizenegy" literally "one on ten"), as with those between 20 and 100 (23 as "huszonhárom" = "three on twenty").

A straightforward decimal rank system with a word for each order (10 , 100 , 1000 , 10,000 ), and in which 11 is expressed as ten-one and 23 as two-ten-three, and 89,345 is expressed as 8 (ten thousands)  9 (thousand)  3 (hundred)  4 (tens)  5 is found in Chinese, and in Vietnamese with a few irregularities.  Japanese, Korean, and Thai have imported the Chinese decimal system. Many other languages with a decimal system have special words for the numbers between 10 and 20, and decades. For example, in English 11 is  "eleven" not "ten-one" or "one-teen".

Incan languages such as Quechua and Aymara have an almost straightforward decimal system, in which 11 is expressed as ten with one and 23 as two-ten with three.

Some psychologists suggest irregularities of the English names of numerals may hinder children's counting ability.

Other bases 

Some cultures do, or did, use other bases of numbers.
 Pre-Columbian Mesoamerican cultures such as the Maya used a base-20 system (perhaps based on using all twenty fingers and toes).
 The Yuki language in California and the Pamean languages in Mexico have octal (base-8) systems because the speakers count using the spaces between their fingers rather than the fingers themselves.
 The existence of a non-decimal base in the earliest traces of the Germanic languages is attested by the presence of words and glosses meaning that the count is in decimal (cognates to "ten-count" or "tenty-wise"); such would be expected if normal counting is not decimal, and unusual if it were.  Where this counting system is known, it is based on the "long hundred" = 120, and a "long thousand" of 1200. The descriptions like "long" only appear after the "small hundred" of 100 appeared with the Christians. Gordon's Introduction to Old Norse  p. 293, gives number names that belong to this system. An expression cognate to 'one hundred and eighty' translates to 200, and the cognate to 'two hundred' translates to 240. Goodare details the use of the long hundred in Scotland in the Middle Ages, giving examples such as calculations where the carry implies i C (i.e. one hundred) as 120, etc. That the general population were not alarmed to encounter such numbers suggests common enough use. It is also possible to avoid hundred-like numbers by using intermediate units, such as stones and pounds, rather than a long count of pounds. Goodare gives examples of numbers like vii score, where one avoids the hundred by using extended scores. There is also a paper by W.H. Stevenson, on 'Long Hundred and its uses in England'.
 Many or all of the Chumashan languages originally used a base-4 counting system, in which the names for numbers were structured according to multiples of 4 and 16.
 Many languages use quinary (base-5) number systems, including Gumatj, Nunggubuyu, Kuurn Kopan Noot and Saraveca. Of these, Gumatj is the only true 5–25 language known, in which 25 is the higher group of 5.
 Some Nigerians use duodecimal systems.  So did some small communities in India and Nepal, as indicated by their languages.
 The Huli language of Papua New Guinea is reported to have base-15 numbers.  Ngui means 15, ngui ki means 15 × 2 = 30, and ngui ngui means 15 × 15 = 225.
 Umbu-Ungu, also known as Kakoli, is reported to have base-24 numbers. Tokapu means 24, tokapu talu means 24 × 2 = 48, and tokapu tokapu means 24 × 24 = 576.
 Ngiti is reported to have a base-32 number system with base-4 cycles.
 The Ndom language of Papua New Guinea is reported to have base-6 numerals.  Mer means 6, mer an thef means 6 × 2 = 12, nif means 36, and nif thef means 36×2 = 72.

See also

Notes

References 

Elementary arithmetic
Fractions (mathematics)
Positional numeral systems